Dimitrios written also as Demetrius Emmanuel Kasdaglis written also as Casdagli(s), (10 October 1872 in Salford – 6 July 1931 in Bad Nauheim) was a Greek-Egyptian tennis player. He competed in the 1896 Summer Olympics in Athens and the 1906 Intercalated Games, also in Athens.

In certain sources his first name has been erroneously cited as Dionysios.

Career

Kasdaglis was born in Kersal Hill, England, was domiciled in Egypt but according to the official bulletin he participated as a member of the Greek team. He made it to the finals in both the singles and doubles events. In the singles, he defeated Defert of France in the first round, Konstantinos Akratopoulos of Greece in the second, and Momcsilló Tapavicza of Hungary in the semifinals before facing John Pius Boland of Great Britain and Ireland in the final. Boland proved the better player, and Kasdaglis finished second. The medal is credited to Kasdaglis as a Greek by the International Olympic Committee.

For the doubles tournament, Kasdaglis paired with Demetrios Petrokokkinos in a team which nowadays is considered a Greek team.They defeated another pair of Greeks, Konstantinos Paspatis and Evangelos Rallis, in the first round and the British/Australian pair of George S. Robertson and Edwin Flack in the semifinals. In the final, Kasdaglis again faced Boland, this time paired with Friedrich Traun of Germany. Kasdaglis and Petrokokkinos lost that match to give Kasdaglis his second silver medal.

References

External links

1872 births
1931 deaths
19th-century Egyptian people
19th-century male tennis players
Egyptian male tennis players
Egyptian people of Greek descent
Greek male tennis players
Medalists at the 1896 Summer Olympics
Olympic tennis players of Greece
Olympic silver medalists for Greece
Olympic medalists in tennis
Sportspeople from Salford
Tennis players at the 1896 Summer Olympics
Tennis players at the 1906 Intercalated Games
People from the City of Salford